The Chataibi District is an Algerian administrative district in the Annaba province.  Its chief town is located on the eponymous town of Chetaïbi .

Communes 
The daira is composed of only one commune: Chetaïbi.

References 

Districts of Tizi Ouzou Province
Districts of Sétif Province